Naro Hari Shrestha (born 12 May 1996) is an Indian professional footballer who plays as a forward for Calcutta Customs in the Calcutta Football League.

Career

Youth career 
Born in West Bengal, Shrestha represented his state in the Santosh Trophy. Shrestha started his youth career playing for India U-18 Elite Academy. He then signed a two-year contract with Salgaocar in 2014. He played a crucial role in Salgaocar junior teams various title victories. Soon the following year Shrestha joined Salgaocar F.C Senior team.

Senior career 
Shrestha began his senior career with Salgaocar. He played for the club in the Goa Professional League. After the Pro League season, he signed with I-League club DSK Shivajians. Shrestha started his DSK Shivajians career by helping his side win the DSK Cup and in the process he became the Golden Boot winner of the tournament. He also played the PDFA Pune Super League 2017 scoring 9 goals in 5 matches in which DSK Shivajians gained comfortable victories over their rival teams.

He made his I-League debut for the club on 11 February 2017 against Shillong Lajong. He came on as an 86th-minute substitute for Kim Song-Yong as DSK Shivajians won 2–1.

In 2020, he moved to FC Bengaluru United and won the 2021–22 Bangalore Super Division title.

In 2022, he represented West Bengal football team at the 36th National Games of India in Gujarat, in which they clinched gold defeating Kerala 5–0 in final.

International 
Naro was selected to join the India U-19 team in the 2014 AFC U-19 Championship qualifications while India got knocked out early in the tournament. He also played a few friendlies when the U-19 team traveled to Shanghai.

Career statistics

Club

Honours

Bengaluru United
 Bangalore Football League: 2021–22

West Bengal
 National Games Gold medal: 2022

References

External links 
 DSK Shivajians Football Club Profile.

1996 births
Living people
Indian footballers
Footballers from West Bengal
Salgaocar FC players
DSK Shivajians FC players
Association football forwards
Goa Professional League players
I-League players
Mohun Bagan AC players
Fateh Hyderabad A.F.C. players
Peerless SC players
FC Bengaluru United players
I-League 2nd Division players
Calcutta Football League players